Horkelia tridentata is a species of flowering plant in the rose family known by the common name threetooth horkelia. It is native to all of the mountain ranges of northern California and southern Oregon, where it grows in coniferous forest. This is a perennial herb forming tufts of erect leaves and stems. The leaves are 3 to 12 centimeters long, each made up of hairy gray-green leaflets which are tipped with usually three teeth. Unlike many other horkelias, this species is generally not strongly scented. The green or reddish stems reach a maximum length of about 40 centimeters and hold clusters of flowers. Each flower has minute bractlets beneath small, hairy, pointed sepals and narrow white petals.

External links
Jepson Manual Treatment
Photo gallery

tridentata
Flora of California
Flora of Oregon
Flora without expected TNC conservation status